Reuben Green (born January 31. 1971) is a former Cobb County Superior Court Judge who was appointed in 2010  and previously lead the Cobb County Veterans Accountability and Treatment Court. Reuben Green was defeated by Angela Brown in the June 2020 election cycle.

Early life
Green comes from Cobb County, Georgia.

Career
Green began his career in private practice at the Atlanta law firm of King & Spalding, in Washington, DC. 
The events of 9/11 pushed Green to return to Cobb County Georgia to serve his country again. He became Assistant District Attorney in the Cobb Judicial Circuit and then Special Assistant United States Attorney in the Northern District of Georgia. 
Green quickly transitioned to Assistant District Attorney in the Cobb County District Attorney's Office, and in the DeKalb County Solicitor General's Office. Green served as State and Federal Prosecutor in the Cobb County District Attorney's Office until Governor Sonny Perdue (R-GA) appointed him to the Cobb Superior Court in 2010. 

Green ran for re-election to the seat in 2012 and won 54.79% to 45.06%. 
In 2014, Green started the Cobb County Veterans Accountability and Treatment Court.

Cobb County Veterans Accountability and Treatment Court

In 2014, Judge Green started the Cobb County Veterans Accountability and Treatment Court. 
The Veterans Court works with honorably discharged veterans who have service connected issues that have led them, in part, to be involved in the criminal justice system.

Personal life

References

Superior court judges in the United States
1971 births
Living people